Chris Latham may refer to:

 Chris Latham (baseball) (born 1973), American baseball player
 Chris Latham (musician), British musician
 Chris Latham (rugby union) (born 1975), Australian rugby union footballer
 Christopher Latham (born 1994), British racing cyclist

See also
 Christine Latham (born 1981), Canadian soccer player
 Christopher Latham Sholes (1819-1890), American inventor